Juan Manuel Cuesta Baena (born 9 February 2002) is a Colombian footballer who currently plays as a midfielder for Aldosivi, on loan from Independiente Medellín.

Career statistics

Club

Notes

References

2002 births
Living people
Footballers from Medellín
Colombian footballers
Colombian expatriate footballers
Colombia youth international footballers
Association football midfielders
Categoría Primera A players
Campeonato Brasileiro Série A players
Argentine Primera División players
Independiente Medellín footballers
Sport Club Internacional players
Aldosivi footballers
Colombian expatriate sportspeople in Brazil
Colombian expatriate sportspeople in Argentina
Expatriate footballers in Brazil
Expatriate footballers in Argentina